Joe Rucker (born October 11, 1976 in Baytown, Texas) is an American country music musician.

Career
Joe Rucker is the youngest of three children. He was born near Houston, Texas, in a place called Baytown, where his father was working a construction contract. Shortly after his birth, the family moved back to their previous home in Geneva, Florida.

Joe grew up listening to his dad, Jerry Rucker, play the guitar and write songs. The family sang on a regular basis at churches and community functions. His sister Michelle (Shelly), vividly recalls him being so shy about being on stage, that he hid behind her while they sang. But that shyness eventually evaporated completely in his late teens, due to (in part) him meeting legendary Grand Ole Opry star,  Hank Locklin. The two originally met when Joe was 11, and went on to develop a lifelong friendship until Locklin's death in 2009. Joe often says that first meeting spent with Locklin set off his passion for music like never before, and was a pivotal turning point in his life as a musician.

He made the move to Nashville, Tennessee in October 1998. One month later, he was invited by Jack Greene to appear on Ernest Tubb's Midnite Jamboree, which is broadcast from "The Air Castle of the South", WSM AM Radio 650, and "Home of the Grand Ole Opry". Since that time, Rucker has made multiple appearances with Bill Anderson, Hank Locklin, Charlie Louvin, Jett Williams, Junior Brown, Paulette Carlson, Glenn Douglas Tubb, Margie Singleton, and others. The Midnite Jamboree is the second oldest live country music radio show in the world. Over the years, it has featured artists such as its original host, Ernest Tubb, along with other stars such as Stonewall Jackson, Martha Carson, Elvis Presley, George Hamilton IV, Loretta Lynn, T. Graham Brown, Randy Travis, Marty Stuart, Patsy Cline, and Hank Williams.

Rucker released his first album entitled Nashville Scenes in 2001. He co-produced it with Doyle Grisham. In 2007, his second effort Untangle My Mind was released. This eighteen song project was self produced by Rucker and included duets with Clifford Curry, Hank Locklin, and Eddy Raven. Joe's sister Michelle Donahue is listed as Executive Producer, helping to finance the project. Rucker went to his hometown (Geneva), for the CD release party, and the community center was standing room only.

As a musician, Rucker is credited on Locklin's 2006 gospel album, By The Grace of God: The Gospel Album, which also included the Oak Ridge Boys, the Jordanaires, and Gold City.

In late 2009, he joined cartoonist / singer / songwriter Guy Gilchrist as bandleader of his group called The Comics. The group did a series of Christmas shows in December 2009 with guest artists Mandy Barnett and Tommy Cash. Rucker left the group in the fall of 2010.

On September 11, 2010, Rucker and his group from Nashville (which included Jennifer Brantley) made his debut on the legendary Wheeling Jamboree out of Wheeling, WV. The Jamboree was once the longtime rival of legendary country radio shows such as the Grand Ole Opry and the Louisiana Hayride and at one time had artists such as Grandpa Jones, Louvin Brothers, the Osborne Brothers, Chickie Williams & Doc Williams, and Jimmy Dickens.

 On the songwriter circuit, Joe has been in rotation on several of the songwriters rounds in Nashville working with the likes of legendary writers such as Nashville Songwriters Hall of Fame member, Jerry Foster  as well as Jim McBride, Jimmy Payne,  Glenn Douglas Tubb, Jimmy Fortune, Dallas Frazier and Marty Raybon.

As an artist, Joe has opened or shared the stage with many of Nashville's hit makers such as Eddy Raven, Baillie & the Boys, Mandy Barnett, Jeannie C. Riley, Leona Williams, Bobby G. Rice, Michael Peterson (singer), John Berry (country singer), Kevin Sharp, Blackhawk (band), Lila McCann, Lorrie Morgan, Linda Davis,  Merrill Osmond, Doug Supernaw, Doug Stone, David Ball (country singer), Jeannie Kendall, Rex Allen Jr., and countless others.

In 2013, Joe shared the loss of the music community when his friend and mentor Jack Greene passed away. He was asked to sing one of Jack's signature tunes "Statue of a Fool" for the Opry Star's Celebration of Life at the Ryman Auditorium. In attendance were several Opry members, including Garth Brooks, who paid Rucker a high complement for his talent and professionalism.

Joe continues to write, record, and perform across the country. In recent years he has teamed up with the legendary Margie Singleton, telling crowds on stage and radio that she is his "Tennessee Mama", while she proclaims him one of her adopted sons. The two write and perform shows together and will have a release of some of their songs in 2019.

When not on tour, Joe is often asked to be the guest of Nashville Cowboy Church (a church in the Music Valley area of Nashville which is also broadcast on WSM and other radio outlets all over the globe), led by Dr. Harry Yates and Joanne Cash Yates (sister of the late superstar Johnny Cash).

In the summer of 2018, Karen Wheeler released her autobiography entitled My Father's Daughter, which recounts humorous stories on and off stage of Wheeler's life. Joe is mentioned in one of those stories and has several pictures in the book as well.

Most recently, Rucker was inducted into the Nashville Chapter of the Academy of Local Musicians Hall of Fame. Others honored with the same recognition include: Jan Howard, Margie Singleton, Jeannie Seely, Tim Atwood, Hawkshaw Hawkins Jr., Scott Sexton, and Exile (American band).

Interesting side note:
Joe's dad, Jerry Rucker, worked in the Space Shuttle program for more than 35 years, and wrote several songs specifically geared towards the Shuttle program. The first song, called Blastoff Columbia, was used to wake up astronauts Robert Crippen and John Young from their first night in space during STS-1. It was a great honor for the entire family, and the song has been featured in several NASA videos and television news reels regarding the Shuttle program.

References

Living people
1976 births
American country singer-songwriters
American male singer-songwriters
Singer-songwriters from Texas
21st-century American singers
Country musicians from Texas
21st-century American male singers